Kowal is a Polish surname meaning "smith". It may refer to:

 Andrzej Kowal (born 1971), Polish volleyball coach
 Aneta Kowal (born 1991), American model
 Austin Kowal (born 1985), American artist
 Charles T. Kowal (1940–2011), American astronomer
 Chester A. Kowal (1904–1966), American politician
 Edmund Kowal (1931–1960), Polish footballer
 Emma Kowal, Australian anthropologist, physician and academic
 Frédéric Kowal (born 1970), French rower
Grzegorz Kowal, Polish diplomat
 Jan Kowal (born 1967), Polish ski jumper
 Joe Kowal (born 1956), Canadian hockey player
 Kristy Kowal (born 1978), American swimmer
 Maksym Kowal (born 1991), Canadian soccer player
 Mandy Kowal (born 1963), American rower
 Marek Kowal (born 1985), Polish footballer
 Mary Robinette Kowal (born 1969), American author
 Matylda Kowal (born 1989), Polish runner
 Mitchell Kowal (1915–1971), American actor
 Paweł Kowal (born 1975), Polish politician
 Stanisław Kowal (1928–2001), Polish triple jumper
 Tom Kowal (born 1967), Canadian hockey referee
 Yoann Kowal (born 1987), French runner

See also
 
 Kowall
 Koval (surname)
 Coval

Polish-language surnames
Surnames of Polish origin